The 1922 season was the third year of competitive football for the Estonia as an independent nation.

Matches

Finland vs Estonia
11 August 1922 and the match against Finland is in the history books for two reasons. Mainly, because when Arnold Kuulman scored a goal in the 40th minute, he became the first ever to do so for the blueshirts. Secondly, it is still, after almost 90 years, the heaviest defeat Estonia has ever borne. For Kuulman it was the 4th and last appearance for the team. While Jarl Öhman scored a double-hattrick, HJK's Verner Eklöf scored third time in a row against Estonia.

Latvia vs Estonia
It was Latvia's first official international match. Debutant August Silber was brother of fellow international Otto Silber. Verner Eklöf, a Finnish international and coach, was the referee.

Players
These 15 players appeared for the national team in 1922:

 Adolf Anier
 Sergei Javorski
 Ernst Joll
 Harald Kaarman

 Arnold Kuulman
 August Lass
 Eduard Maurer
 Heinrich Paal

 Arnold Pihlak
 Bernhard Rein
 August Silber
 Otto Silber

 Vladimir Tell
 Georg Vain
 Oskar Üpraus

Goalscorers
1 goal
 Arnold Kuulman
 Vladimir Tell

Debutants
 #20–#23: Adolf Anier, Sergei Javorski, Eduard Maurer and Bernhard Rein in the match against Finland.
 #24: August Silber in the match against Latvia.

References

1922
1922 national football team results
National